The Cave Rescue Organisation (CRO) is a voluntary body based in the caving area of the Yorkshire Dales in northern England. Founded in 1935, it is the first cave rescue agency in the world.

Although it is staffed by volunteers and funded by donations, it is integrated into the emergency services and will be called out if the police are notified that there has been a caving incident. CRO often doubles as local mountain rescue and frequently rescues livestock which have become stuck in caves or on crags. In 1986 team member Dave Anderson was drowned in Rowten Pot whilst attending an incident.

CRO publishes an annual incident report.

See also
British Cave Rescue Council
Cave Diving Group
Caving in the United Kingdom

Further reading

References

External links
 CRO website

Cave rescue organizations
Organisations based in North Yorkshire
Volunteer search and rescue in the United Kingdom
Yorkshire Dales
Organizations established in 1935
1935 establishments in the United Kingdom